The 2012–13 Virginia Tech Hokies men's basketball team represented Virginia Polytechnic Institute and State University during the 2012–13 NCAA Division I men's basketball season. The Hokies, led by first year head coach James Johnson, played their home games at Cassell Coliseum and were members of the Atlantic Coast Conference. They finished the season 13–19, 4–14 in ACC play to finish in last place. They lost in the first round of the ACC tournament to NC State.

Roster

Schedule

|-
!colspan=9| Regular season

|-
!colspan=9| ACC men's basketball tournament

References

Virginia Tech Hokies men's basketball seasons
Virginia Tech
Virginia Tech
Virginia Tech